The Clay Center for the Arts and Sciences of West Virginia in Charleston, West Virginia, US is a  facility dedicated to promoting performing arts, visual arts, and the sciences. All three being housed under one roof makes the Clay Center one of the few of its kind in the United States.

History
The Clay Center opened on July 12, 2003, and is one of the most ambitious economic, cultural and educational undertakings in West Virginia history. It is currently the home to Avampato Discovery Museum, Juliet Art Museum and the West Virginia Symphony.

The Avampato Discovery Museum
The Avampato Discovery Museum features two floors of interactive science exhibits and an art gallery.  Science gallery themes include creativity and engineering; sound, light and color; energy and magnetism; earth science; health and wellness; and a special area for children age five and under.  The Museum's art gallery features selections from its permanent collections and traveling exhibitions.

The Caperton Planetarium and Theater is part of the Museum and presents planetarium shows and large format films on its giant domed screen. Admission to the Theater is in addition to the regular Museum ticket.

Juliet Art Museum
The Juliet Art Museum hosts traveling exhibits from artists and museums nation-wide as well as exhibits that feature work from an incredible permanent collection, providing visitors with completely new experiences every few months. The Museum offers a large variety of educational programs including tours through the art galleries and workshops.

Other facilities
The Maier Performance Hall, an 1,883-seat theater with exceptional acoustics and sight lines
The Walker Theater, a black-box theater which can accommodate between 150 – 200 people depending upon the set-up
Caperton Planetarium

History
The Clay Center is named for West Virginia philanthropists Buckner and Lyell Clay of the Clay Foundation.  Construction began in 1999.

The Sunrise Museum was the original science and art museum in Charleston, which closed and became the new Avampato Discovery Museum when the Clay Center opened. The Sunrise Museum was located in the Sunrise Mansion.

References

External links
Official website

West Virginia culture
Music venues in West Virginia
Buildings and structures in Charleston, West Virginia
Performing arts centers in West Virginia
Tourist attractions in Kanawha County, West Virginia
Institutions accredited by the American Alliance of Museums